The lord president of the Council is the presiding officer of the Privy Council of the United Kingdom and the fourth of the Great Officers of State, ranking below the Lord High Treasurer but above the Lord Keeper of the Privy Seal. The Lord President usually attends and is responsible for chairing the meetings of the Privy Council, presenting business for the approval of the sovereign. In the modern era, the incumbent is by convention always a member of one of the Houses of Parliament, and the office is normally a Cabinet position.

The office and its history

The Privy Council meets once a month, wherever the sovereign may be residing at the time, to give formal approval to Orders in Council. Only a few privy counsellors need attend such meetings, and only when invited to do so at the government's request. As the duties of the Lord President are not onerous, the post has often been given to a government minister whose responsibilities are not department-specific. In recent years it has been most typical for the Lord President also to serve as Leader of the House of Commons or Leader of the House of Lords. The Lord President has no role in the Judicial Committee of the Privy Council.

Unlike some of the other Great Officers of State, the office of Lord President is not very old (relative to the over 1,000-year history of government in the British Isles), the first certain appointment to the office being that of the Duke of Suffolk in 1529. (Although there is a reference to Edmund Dudley serving as 'president of the council' in 1497, it was only in 1529 that the role was given the style and precedence of a Great Officer of State by Act of Parliament.) Prior to 1679 there were several periods in which the office was left vacant.

In the 19th century, the Lord President was generally the cabinet member responsible for the education system, amongst his other duties. This role was gradually scaled back in the late 19th and early 20th centuries but remnants of it remain, such as the oversight of the governance of various universities.

During times of National or coalition government the office of Lord President has sometimes been held by the leader of a minority party (e.g. Baldwin 1931–1935, MacDonald 1935–1937, Attlee 1943–1945, Clegg 2010–2015). It has been suggested that the office has been intermittently used for Prime Ministerial deputies in the past.

A particularly vital role was played by the Lord President of the Council during the Second World War. The Lord President served as chairman of the Lord President's Committee. This committee acted as a central clearing house which dealt with the country's economic problems. This was vital to the smooth running of the British war economy and consequently the entire British war effort.

Winston Churchill, clearly believing that this wartime co-ordinating role was beneficial, introduced a similar but expanded system in the first few years of his post-war premiership. The so-called 'overlord ministers' included Frederick Leathers as Secretary of State for the Co-ordination of Transport, Fuel and Power and Lord Woolton as Lord President. Woolton's job was to co-ordinate the then separate ministries of agriculture and food. The historian Lord Hennessy of Nympsfield quotes a PhD thesis by Michael Kandiah saying that Woolton was "arguably the most successful of the Overlords" partly because his ministries were quite closely related; indeed, they were merged in 1955 as the Ministry of Agriculture, Fisheries and Food.

On several occasions since 1954, non-British Ministers have served briefly as acting Lords President of the Council, solely to preside over a meeting of the Privy Council held in a Commonwealth realm. Examples of this practice are the meetings in New Zealand in 1990 and 1995, when Geoffrey Palmer and James Bolger respectively were acting Lords President.

Andrea Leadsom's appointment in June 2017 was the first in some time where the post holder was not a full Cabinet member.

Visitorial role

The Lord President also serves as the visitor for several English universities, including:

University of Birmingham
University of Bristol
University of Hull
Imperial College London
Keele University
University of Leeds
University of Leicester
University of Liverpool
University of London (but not King's College London or University College London)
University of Nottingham
University of Reading
University of Sheffield
University of Southampton
University of Sussex

Partial list of Lords President of the Council

Lords President of the Council (c.1530–1702)

Lord Presidents of the Council (1702–present)

See also
 Privy Council Office
 Vice-President of the Executive Council
 President of the King's Privy Council for Canada
 Sinecure

References

Citations

Sources 

 

 
Lists of government ministers of the United Kingdom
People associated with the University of Birmingham
People associated with the University of Bristol
People associated with the University of East Anglia
People associated with the University of Hull
People associated with Imperial College London
People associated with Keele University
People associated with the University of Leeds
People associated with the University of Leicester
People associated with the University of Liverpool
People associated with the University of London
People associated with the University of Nottingham
People associated with the University of Reading
People associated with the University of Sheffield
People associated with the University of Southampton
People associated with the University of Sussex
People associated with the University of Wales
Ministerial offices in the United Kingdom
Privy Council of the United Kingdom
1530 establishments in England